Porra may refer to:
Fried dough similar to churro
Lauri Porra (born 1977), Finnish musician
Pedro Rivera (footballer) (born 19976), full name: Pedro Rubén Rivera Porra
 (1906-1950), French rugby player
Pora River, Italy

See also

Pora (disambiguation)